Alexander Erler and Lucas Miedler were the defending champions but lost in the semifinals to Reese Stalder and Petros Tsitsipas.

Purav Raja and Divij Sharan won the title after defeating Stalder and Tsitsipas 6–7(5–7), 6–3, [10–8] in the final.

Seeds

Draw

References

External links
 Main draw

HPP Open - Doubles